Patric-Fritz Leitner (born 23 February 1977 in Berchtesgaden, Bavaria) is a German luger who competed from 1998 to 2010. Together with Alexander Resch he won the men's doubles event at the 2002 Winter Olympics in Salt Lake City, United States. They also competed at the 2006 Winter Olympics, finishing sixth. At the 2010 Winter Olympics in Vancouver, they won bronze in their last race.

In addition they won a dozen medals at the FIL World Luge Championships, including eight golds (Men's doubles:1999, 2000, 2004, 2007; Mixed team: 2001, 2003, 2004, 2007), two silvers (Men's doubles: 2005, Mixed team: 2000), and two bronzes (Men's doubles: 2003, Mixed team 1999). At the FIL European Luge Championships, they also won seven medals with five golds (Men's doubles: 2000, 2002, 2004, 2006; Mixed team: 2000), one silver (Mixed team: 2002), and one bronze (Men's doubles: 2008 (tied with Italy)).

They won the overall Luge World Cup men's doubles title six times (1999-2000, 2001-2, 2003-4, 2005-6, 2006-7, 2007-8).

After retiring from competition, Leitner became involved in luge coaching. He is responsible for a group of German lugers nicknamed the "Sunshine Training Group", alongside Georg Hackl, with Leitner having responsibility for their athletic training. Members of the group include Felix Loch, Natalie Geisenberger, Tobias Wendl and Tobias Arlt, who between them took a clean sweep of the gold medals in luge at the 2014 Winter Olympics.

References

DatabaseOlympics.com profile on Leitner.
FIL-Luge profile
Fuzilogik Sports - Winter Olympic results - Men's luge
Hickoksports.com results on Olympic champions in luge and skeleton.
Hickok sports information on World champions in luge and skeleton.
List of men's doubles luge World Cup champions since 1978.

External links
 
 
 

1977 births
Living people
German male lugers
German sports coaches
Olympic lugers of Germany
Olympic gold medalists for Germany
Olympic bronze medalists for Germany
Olympic medalists in luge
Lugers at the 2002 Winter Olympics
Lugers at the 2006 Winter Olympics
Lugers at the 2010 Winter Olympics
Medalists at the 2010 Winter Olympics
Medalists at the 2002 Winter Olympics
People from Berchtesgaden
Sportspeople from Upper Bavaria